Liddle is a surname. It may also refer to:

 Liddle Brook, a river in Delaware County in New York
 Liddle Burnt Mound, a Bronze Age site on the island of South Ronaldsay, Orkney
 USS Liddle (DE-206), a Buckley-class destroyer escort of the United States Navy
 Liddle Towers (1936–1976), electrician and amateur boxing coach

See also
 Liddle's syndrome, autosomal dominant disorder that mimics hyperaldosteronism
 Liddle Kiddle, a doll produced by Mattel Inc. Toymakers
 Liddell (disambiguation)
 Lidl, a German supermarket chain